Children's World Ltd was a British retail chain. It was established by Boots in 1987 and sold to Storehouse in 1996, when the stores were rebranded as Mothercare World.

Format

At the time, Boots' larger high street stores sold a range of baby products, maternity and children's clothing. However the Children's World stores were a larger "superstore" format typically located on retail parks, which sold a wider range of children's clothes, shoes, toys, baby products, nursery furniture. The stores also included a play area, hairdresser and a snack bar.

Marketing
The logo resembled a pile of multicoloured building blocks. The slogan was "Everything in the World for Children".

Finances

By 1995 the retailer had 48 stores and a turnover of £105 million. Storehouse acquired the business from Boots in 1996.

References

Walgreens Boots Alliance
Defunct retail companies of the United Kingdom
Retail companies established in 1987
1987 establishments in the United Kingdom